The Timmins Fire Department provides fire protection, technical rescue services, hazardous materials response, and first responder emergency medical assistance to the city of Timmins, Ontario.

Organization 
The Timmins Fire Department is headed by the Fire Chief who is assisted by the Deputy Chief. The department consists of 28 full-time firefighters. The jurisdiction of the Department is covered by seven wards consisting of volunteer firefighters.

Wards 

1 - Mountjoy
2 - South Porcupine
3 - Schumacher
4 - Whitney
4c - Connaught
5 - Timmins
7 - Airport

History 
The Department was established in 1911, after a devastating fire which destroyed the community of South Porcupine. Locals gathered inside of a box car owned by the Temiskaming & Northern Ontario Railway. The Town of Timmins was incorporated the next year.

References 

1911 establishments in Ontario
Fire departments in Ontario
Municipal government of Timmins